The villages of Killucan and Rathwire are co-located in the east of County Westmeath, Ireland. They have a combined population of 1,370 according to the 2016 census.

History

History of Rathwire
Both Killucan and Rathwire have ancient origins, as indicated by the ancient "Fairy Fort" in Rathwire. According to legend, this was built by the Chieftain Guaire who gave Rathwire its name. The ruins of the hillfort remain on the western end of the village. Legend has it that Guaire is buried in the ruins and is guarded by a savage dog who does not want the remains disturbed. Subsequently, the Norman Lord Hugh de Lacy built his Motte alongside the remains of Guaire's Fort. In 1210, the notorious King John came to Rathwire to subdue the De Lacys when he fought and won the Battle of Killucan. While here he also received the Gaelic King of Connacht, Cathal Crobderg O'Connor, who travelled to make his submission. In the fifteenth and sixteenth centuries, Rathwire belonged to the Darcy family of Platten. Their castle of Rathwire was burnt during the rebellion of Silken Thomas.

History of Killucan

 
The origins of the name Killucan are uncertain but it probably comes from the Irish Cill Lucaine (Church of Lucan). Lucan was a 6th-century abbot who is believed to have founded a church in the area. The church, however, did not survive to the Middle Ages and no trace of it remains today. Some believe that Lucaine is, in fact, a corruption of Etchén, who was bishop of the nearby Clonfad monastery. Whichever version is correct, the present-day church in Killucan is St. Etchén's. There has been a church on this site since the time of the Normans (the De Lacys). The present church on the site dates from 1802. Inside this church is a 13th-century chalice. On the east end of the site are the remains of a 15th-century medieval tomb. Although the site was initially used as a Catholic Church, it was changed to a Protestant (Anglican) one during the Cromwellian Plantation.

After the Penal Laws persecuting Catholics were reformed in the 19th century, a new Catholic church, St Joseph's, was built in Rathwire. St. Joseph's Church was built in the neo-Gothic style at the end of the 1830s, being completed around 1840. It was constructed under the orders of The Rev. Fr. Eugene O'Rourke, the Parish Priest of the area at that time. Fr. O'Rourke also had the rather incongruous Italianate belfry added almost thirty years later, in the late 1860s.

Killucan parish

The parish of Killucan is one of the largest in Westmeath (by area). It includes both Killucan and Rathwire as well as the countryside around them. St. Joseph's Church is in Rathwire while St. Mary's is in Raharney. The parish priest's house (parochial house) is in Rathwire.

Economy
The majority of people living in Killucan and Rathwire commute to work elsewhere. Economic prosperity has historically been linked with transport connections to places like Dublin. The Royal Canal and the Sligo-Dublin railway line pass through the area – although neither is used as a mode of transport anymore. For example, the railway station (called Killucan Station and located nearby at Riverstown) closed in 1963 (although the line remains in use). Sports facilities serving the area include a free golf course and fishing lake, a library and other amenities. The majority of its inhabitants work outside the village. The only large employer in the area is Shay Murtagh's Quarry and concrete production.

Schools
There are three primary schools (national schools) in the parish, including St.Patrick's NS in Killucan, St.Joseph's NS in Rathwire, and St.Mary's NS in Raharney.

There is a secondary school, Columba College, located in Killucan.

Transport

Royal Canal

The twin villages reached the height of their prosperity during the 18th and 19th centuries due to the arrival of first the Royal Canal in 1805 and later the Midland Great Western Railway. The canal was built between 1790 and 1817, reaching Killucan from Dublin in 1805. It grew in the importance of transporting people and goods until the mid-19th century. After this, the advent of rail and road travel in Ireland led to its slow decline and it formally closed in 1961. It was abandoned and became unusable for many years. Nowadays, following effort from the Royal Canal Amenity Group, it has been restored for leisure boats from Dublin to Abbeyshrule in County Longford. The remaining section from Abbeyshrule to Cloondara was due to open in 2006. It is to walk the entire length using the Royal Canal Way. The canal is an important amenity in Killucan, being used for fishing, walks, boating and canoeing. The Harbour at Thomastown (1 kilometre South of Killucan) was recently expanded to cater for the growing number of tourists who rent barges from there. East of the flight there are no further locks for  while there are no further locks to the west until past Mullingar, the highest point on the Canal.

Railway

The Midland Great Western Railway reached the town in 1848 when their railway line was extended from Hill of Down to Mullingar. The station, known as Killucan railway station and located at Riverstown, closed in 1963. The signal cabin remained open until 2005 when automated signalling was introduced.

There has been a campaign during the 2010s in favour of the train station being reopened, although as of 2019 there is a lack of capacity on the Dublin-Sligo railway line due to a lack of carriages. Iarnród Éireann, the state-owned railway company, has ordered a new fleet of carriages that will be operational from 2021. Denis Leonard of the Killucan Kinnegad Transport Lobby Group has said that "a feasibility study has to be conducted, funding secured for work on the station and planning permission sought" and that "it is unlikely that all of these steps would be completed before the arrival of the new carriages."

Public transport
Bus Éireann route 115A provides a commuter service from Killucan to Dublin via Ballivor, Summerhill, Kilcock and Maynooth and vice versa Mondays to Fridays inclusive. The route 118 service to/from Mullingar, which additionally served Rathwire was discontinued after operation on 24 August 2013.

Sport

Killucan has a Gaelic football team at senior club level. They won the intermediate championship in 2005 and have remained at senior level since, reaching the county semi-final in 2006. Killucan lost to eventual champions Tyrrellspass in 2010.

See also
 List of towns and villages in Ireland
 Market Houses in Ireland

References

External links

 Killucan Web Pages
 Killucan Parish

Towns and villages in County Westmeath